The Southern Riverina Football Association was first established in 1905 for towns in the Southern Riverina area of New South Wales, near the Murray River, which evolved into a strong and vibrant Australian rules football competition for the next 27 years.

History
The Southern Riverina Football Association (SRFA) was first established in 1905. for towns in the Southern Riverina area, near the Murray River, New South Wales to initially play a series of friendly matches. The competition evolved over the next few years and it went onto become a strong and vibrant football competition up until 1931.

In 1907, the SRFA consisted of five teams, Berrigan, Finley, Jerilderie, Leniston and Trefoil Park.

In 1908, Trefoil Park dropped out of the SRFA competition, leaving just four teams.

In 1912, Berrigan, Finley and Tocumwal attended the Annual General Meeting and as Finley agreed to field two teams, the association was reformed. But shortly afterwards, Tocumwal joined the Goulburn Valley Football Association and thus the association went into recess  for the 1912 season.

In 1917, the SRFA consisted of the following four teams – Berrigan, Finley, Jerilderie "Diehards" and the Mairjimmy "Hayseeds".

Tocumwal played in seven consecutive Southern Riverina Football Association grand finals between 1922 and 1928, but unfortunately they only won the last won in 1928.

In 1928, six teams made up the SRFA – Berrigan, Corree, Finley, Jerilderie, Lalalty and Tocumwal.

In 1931, the SRFA senior football competition was abandoned late in the season, due to a very wet winter, with many matches postponed due to the poor road conditions in the area.

The demise of the SRFA came about when both Berrigan and Finley applied to join the Murray Football League (MFL) in 1932, but the two teams were rejected on the grounds of excessive travel for the Victorian-based clubs.

This left Berrigan and Finley without a senior football competition in 1932 as both clubs did not want to travel to Oaklands and Urana to compete. Berrigan and Finley both entered a team in the SRFA junior competition in 1932. Both clubs, along with Nathalia were finally admitted into the MFL in 1933.

SRFA – Competition Teams
The teams below competed in the SRFA in the seasons indicated below.
Barooga – 1929 & 1930.
Berrigan – 1905 to 1931
 Coree – 1916 to 1931
Finley – 1905 to 1931
Jerilderie – 1905, 1907 to 1931
Lalalty – 1921 to 1929
Leniston – 1906 to 1908
Mairjimmy – 1917
Oaklands 1931
Savernake
Savernake / Warmatta Football Club – 1909 to 
Tocumwal – 1910 & 1911, 1913 & 14, 1916, 1918 to 1930
Trefoil Park – 1906 & 1907
Urana – 1931

SRFA – Grand Finals / Premiers
1905: No Premiership, only friendly matches.
1906: No Grand Final. 1st: Berrigan, 2nd: Finley, 3rd: Leniston, 4th Trefoil Park.
1907: No Grand Final. 1st: Finley, 2nd: Jerilderie.
1908: Leniston: 1.6 – 12 defeated Berrigan: 0.6 – 6.
1909: Berrigan: 4.4 – 28 defeated Finley: 1.4 – 10
1910: Finley: 3.7 – 25 defeated Berrigan: 0.3 – 3.
1911: Berrigan: 5.7 – 37 defeated Tocumwal: 3.13 – 31. Tocumwal as minor premiers had the right to challenge Berrigan to another game.
1911: Tocumwal: 3.10 – 28 defeated Berrigan: 1.6 – 12. Tocumwal won the "Challenge Final" & the 1911 SRFA Premiership.
1912: SRFA in recess
1913: Berrigan: 5.3 – 33 defeated Finley: 2.11 – 23.
1914: Finley: 9.11 – 65 defeated Tocumwal: 2.3 – 15.
1915: SRFA appears to be in recess, due to World War I
1916: Berrigan: 3.8 – 26 defeated Tocumwal: 1.1 – 7.
1917: Berrigan ?
1918: Berrigan: 7.4 – 46 defeated Finley: 6.7 – 43. Finley. Finley as minor premiers had the right to challenge Berrigan to another game.
1918: Berrigan apparently defeated Finley by 8 points in the "Challenge Final". Finley protested the decision & the protest was upheld, giving Finley the 1918 – SRFA Premiership.
1919: Berrigan: 6.11 – 47 defeated Finley: 2.4 – 16.
1920: Berrigan: 4.11 – 35 defeated Finley: 2.5 – 17.
1921: Berrigan: 5.9 – 39 defeated Jerilderie: 5.7 – 37.
1922: Finley: 5.14 – 44 defeated Tocumwal: 2.5 – 17.
1923: Finley: 5.4 – 34 defeated Tocumwal: 4.8 – 32.
1924: Berrigan: 3.4 – 22 defeated Tocumwal: 2.8 – 20.
1925: Berrigan: 11.17 – 83 defeated Tocumwal: 7.4 – 46.
1926: Finley: 10.8 – 68 defeated Tocumwal: 5.2 – 32.
1927: Finley: 11.9 – 75 defeated Tocumwal: 4.10 – 34.
1928: Tocumwal: 8.17 – 65 defeated Finley: 6.6 – 42.
1929: Finley: 11.16 – 82 defeated Coree: 11.15 – 81.
1930: Finley: 12.11 – 83 defeated Berrigan: 10.14 – 74.
1931: Season abandoned due to wet weather & poor road conditions.

Southern Riverina Junior Football Association
A Southern Riverina Junior Football Association was established in 1930 and the grand final scores are listed below.
 1930 – Berrigan: 6.9 – 45 defeated Tocumwal: 5.9 – 39.
 1931 – Berrigan: 7.8 – 50 defeated Tocumwal: 6.10 – 46.
 1932 – Tocumwal: 5.9 – 39 defeated Berrigan: 3.13 – 31.

In May 1933, at the Annual General Meeting of the SRJFA, it was decided to change the name of the competition to the Murray River Second Eighteen Football Association, with Cobram being admitted to play against – Berrigan, Finley, Jerilderie and Tocumwal.
 1933 – Jerilderie: 7.11 – 53 defeated Cobram: 8.3 – 51.
 1934 – Jerilderie: 9.15 – 69 defeated Tocumwal: 5.5 – 35.
 1935 – Cobram: 6.5 – 35 defeated Berrigan: 4.4 – 28.
 1936 – Cobram / Barooga United: 9.7 – 61 defeated Jerilderie: 7.3 – 45.
 1937 – Jerilderie: 9.11 – 65 defeated Barooga: 6.3 – 39.
 1938 – Jerilderie: 12.12 – 84 defeated Berrigan: 7.7 – 49.
 1939 – Berrigan: 11.14 – 80 defeated Tocumwal: 8.12 – 60.
 1940 – The 1940 season commenced, but it was most likely abandoned later in the season due to World War II.
1941 to 1944: In recess due to World War II.
In 1945, the Southern Riverina Junior Football Association was re-established. The grand final results are listed below – 
1945 – Tocumwal: 12.7 – 79 defeated Berrigan: 11.11 – 77.

In 1946, the Jerilderie Herald and Urana Advertiser was writing this competition up as the – Murray Valley Second Eighteen Football Association. Grand Finals scores were – 
 1946 – Tocumwal: 9.13 – 67 defeated Jerilderie: 4.10 – 34
1947 – Berrigan: 9.11 – 54 defeated Finley: 6.9 – 45.
1948 – Berrigan: 12.15 – 87 defeated Jerilderie: 12.10 – 82.
1949 – Finley: 8.12 – 60 defeated Barooga: 6.12 – 48.
1950 – Barooga: 9.7 – 61 drew with Finley: 8.13 – 61.
1950 – Barooga: 8.11 – 59 defeated Finley: 6.2 – 38. Grand Final replay.
1951 – Jerilderie: 9.8 – 62 defeated Barooga: 8.9 – 57.
1952 – Barooga: 8.14 – 62 defeated Yarrawonga: 8.7 – 55.
1953 – Barooga: 10.18 – 78 defeated Yarrawonga: 6.7 – 43.
1954 – Denilquin: 17.11 – 113 defeated Jerilderie: 4.8 – 32.
1955 – Yarrawonga defeated Barooga?, at Tocumwal.
1956 – Barooga defeated Denilquin by 9 points. At Tocumwal.

References

Australian rules football in Australia
1905 establishments in Australia
Sports leagues established in 1905
Defunct Australian rules football competitions in New South Wales
Sport in the Riverina